Christina Lamb OBE (born 15 May 1965) is a British journalist and author. She is the chief foreign correspondent of The Sunday Times.

Lamb has won sixteen major awards including four British Press Awards and the European Prix Bayeux-Calvados for war correspondents. She is an Honorary Fellow of University College, Oxford, a Fellow of the Royal Geographical Society and a Global Fellow for the Wilson Centre for International Affairs in Washington D.C. In 2013 she was appointed an OBE by the Queen for services to journalism. In November 2018, Lamb received an honorary degree of Doctor of Laws from the University of Dundee.

She has written ten books including the bestselling The Africa House and I Am Malala, co-written with Malala Yousafzai, which was named Popular Non-Fiction Book of the Year in the British National Book Awards 2013.

Education 
Lamb was educated at Nonsuch High School for Girls, Cheam, and graduated with a BA in Philosophy, Politics, and Economics from the University of Oxford.

Career 
In 1988, Lamb was awarded Young Journalist of the Year for her coverage of the Soviet occupation of Afghanistan.

As a journalist, Lamb travelled with the Mujahidin fighting the Soviet occupation, spending the next two years living in Peshawar. She has reported on Pakistan and Afghanistan for more than three decades.

Lamb has been based in Islamabad and Rio de Janeiro for the Financial Times and Johannesburg and Washington D.C. for The Sunday Times. She has covered wars from Iraq to Libya, Angola to Syria; repression from Eritrea to Zimbabwe; and journeyed to the far reaches of the Amazon to visit remote tribes. She pays particular attention to issues such as the girls abducted by Boko Haram in Nigeria, Yazidi sex slaves in Iraq, and the plight of Afghan women.

In November 2001, Lamb was deported from Pakistan after uncovering evidence of a covert operation by rogue elements in the ISI, Pakistan's military intelligence service, to smuggle arms to the Taliban. In 2006, she narrowly escaped with her life when caught in a Taliban ambush of British troops in Helmand. She was on Benazir Bhutto's bus when it was blown up in October 2007.

I Am Malala, an account of the life of main author Malala Yousafzai, has been translated into 40 languages, and has sold close to two million copies worldwide.

Her book Nujeen: One Girl's Incredible Journey from War-torn Syria in a Wheelchair co-written with Nujeen Mustafa, was published by William Collins (London) in September 2016 and was translated in nine languages. The book Nujeen inspired a five-movement cantata Everyday Wonders: The Girl from Aleppo written by Kevin Crossley-Holland (text) and Cecilia McDowall (music) first performed by The National Children's Choir of Great Britain in Birmingham Town Hall on 10 August 2018.

Lamb's book Our Bodies, Their Battlefield was published by William Collins (London) in March 2020 and by Scribner (New York) in September 2020 and was translated into 14 languages. Her latest book The Prince Rupert Hotel for the Homeless: A True Story of Love and Compassion Amid a Pandemic was published by William Collins (London) in June 2022. 

Her first play Drones, Baby, Drones with Ron Hutchison was performed at London's Arcola Theatre in 2016.

Lamb is a Patron of the UK-registered charity Afghan Connection.

In 2009, Lamb's portrait was on display in the Ashmolean Museum in Oxford. A photograph of her by Francesco Guidicini is in the Photographs Collection of the National Portrait Gallery. She inspired the character Esther in the novel The Zahir (2005) written by Paulo Coelho.

In 2017, she was the first female former undergraduate of University College, Oxford, to be elected an Honorary Fellow. The Fellowship was awarded in recognition of "her courageous, vivid and critically important journalism, as well as for her support of the College".

In April 2021, she wrote an article in The Sunday Times covering Prince Philip's funeral in which she stated "Prince Philip was the longest serving royal consort in British history – an often crotchety figure, offending people with gaffes about slitty eyes, even if secretly we rather enjoyed them". In response to calls for a retraction of the article on the grounds that it was "trivialising racism", Sunday Times editor Emma Tucker apologised “for the offence caused”, stating that Lamb "never intended to make light of his remark in any way".

Books
Waiting for Allah: Pakistan's Struggle for Democracy (London: Hamish Hamilton, 1991. )
The Africa House: The True Story of an English Gentleman and His African Dream (London: Viking, 1999. )
The Sewing Circles of Herat: My Afghan Years (London: HarperCollins, 2002. )
House of Stone: The True Story of a Family Divided in War-Torn Zimbabwe (London: HarperPress, 2007. )
Small Wars Permitting: Dispatches from Foreign Lands (London: HarperPress, 2008. )
I Am Malala: The Girl Who Stood Up for Education and was Shot by the Taliban co-written with Malala Yousafzai (New York: Little Brown, 2013. )
Farewell Kabul: From Afghanistan to a More Dangerous World (London: William Collins, 2015. )
Nujeen: One Girl's Incredible Journey from War-torn Syria in a Wheelchair co-written with Nujeen Mustafa (London: William Collins, 2016. )
Our Bodies, Their Battlefield: What War Does to Women (London: William Collins, 2020. )
The Prince Rupert Hotel for the Homeless: A True Story of Love and Compassion Amid a Pandemic (London: William Collins, 2022. )

Awards

Journalism awards
1988 British Press Awards Young Journalist of the Year
1991 British Press Awards Reporter of the Year
1992 Amnesty International UK Media Awards, Winner, category Periodicals
2001 British Press Awards Foreign Reporter of the Year
2001 Foreign Press Association (London), Foreign Affairs Story of the Year
2002 BBC What the Papers Say Awards, Foreign Correspondent of the Year
2006 British Press Awards Foreign Reporter of the Year
2006 BBC What the Papers Say Awards, Foreign Correspondent of the Year
2007 BBC What the Papers Say Awards, Foreign Correspondent of the Year
2007 Foreign Press Association (London), Print & Web News Story of the Year 
2009 Prix Bayeux-Calvados des correspondants de guerre Trophée Presse écrite
2015 Amnesty International UK Media Awards, Winner, category National Newspapers
2016 Foreign Press Association (London), Print & Web Feature Story of the Year
2017 Women on the Move Awards, The Sue Lloyd-Roberts Media Award
2019 British Press Awards Feature Writer of the Year
2022 Society of Editors Outstanding Contribution to Journalism Award
2022 Society of Editors Media Freedom Awards, Foreign Correspondent of the Year

Book awards
1999 John Llewellyn Rhys Prize, Finalist (The Africa House)
2003 Barnes & Noble Discover Great New Writers Award, Finalist (The Sewing Circles of Herat)
2013 Specsavers National Book Awards, Popular Non-Fiction Book of the Year (I Am Malala)
2013 Goodreads Choice Awards, Best Memoir & Autobiography (I Am Malala)
2014 Political Book Awards, Finalist, Political Book of the Year (I Am Malala)
2020 The Baillie Gifford Prize for Non-Fiction, shortlist (Our Bodies, Their Battlefield)
2021 PEN/John Kenneth Galbraith Award for Nonfiction, longlist (Our Bodies, Their Battlefield)
2021 New York Public Library Helen Bernstein Book Award for Excellence in Journalism, shortlist (Our Bodies, Their Battlefield)
2021 The Orwell Prize for Political Writing, shortlist (Our Bodies, Their Battlefield)
2021 The Witold Pilecki International Book Award, Winner (Our Bodies, Their Battlefield)

Other awards
Nieman Fellow at Harvard University in 1993/94
Dart Center Ochberg Fellow in 2008.
Recognised in She magazine as one of 'Britain's most inspirational women'.
Recognised in Grazia as one of their 'icons of the decade'.
Chosen by the ASHA foundation as one of their inspirational women worldwide.
Included in Harper's Bazaar's list of 150 Visionary Women 2017 as 'one of the most influential female leaders in the UK'.

References

External links

HarperCollins
Christina Lamb at IMDb
Christina Lamb at Goodreads
BBC Radio Four Woman's Hour (2002)
BBC Radio Four Woman's Hour (2006)
BBC Radio Four Woman's Hour (2008)
BBC Radio Four Woman's Hour (2020)
Frontline Club Insight with Christina Lamb (2015)
BBC Radio Three Private Passions (2015)
The Moth War and Ham Sandwiches (2016)
TEDx Talks Finding Hope in Dark Places: Women in War (2017)
BBC Radio Four Desert Island Discs (2018)

Photographs of Christina Lamb:
Getty Images
National Portrait Gallery

1965 births
Living people
Alumni of University College, Oxford
British journalists
Nieman Fellows
Officers of the Order of the British Empire
English expatriates in Pakistan
British biographers
British war correspondents
British memoirists